Vivek K Goyal is an American engineering professor, author, and inventor.  He is currently Professor of Electrical and Computer Engineering at Boston University (BU). He was named Fellow of the Institute of Electrical and Electronics Engineers (IEEE) in 2014 for contributions to information representations and their applications in acquisition, communication, and estimation. He was named OSA Fellow in the 2020 class for outstanding inventions in computational imaging and sensing, including unprecedented demonstrations of the utility of weak, mixed, and indirect optical measurements. He is also a member of the IEEE Information Theory Society.

Education and career
Goyal attended Malcolm Price Laboratory School in Cedar Falls, Iowa, through graduation from its Northern University High School division. He received BS and BSE degrees from the University of Iowa in 1993 and MS and PhD degrees from University of California, Berkeley, in 1995 and 1998, respectively. From 1998 to 2000 he served as a Member of Technical Staff at Bell Labs, and from 2001 to 2003 served as a Senior Research Engineer at Digital Fountain. He returned to UC Berkeley in 2003 as a visiting scholar, and from 2004 to 2013 was with the Massachusetts Institute of Technology, including holding the Esther and Harold E. Edgerton chair in the Department of Electrical Engineering and Computer Science. He has been with Boston University since 2016, after two years with the Nest Labs division of Alphabet Inc.

Scientific contributions 
Goyal coauthored the 2014 textbook Foundations of Signal Processing with Martin Vetterli and Jelena Kovačević.  The book was blurbed by notable educators and researchers in the field of signal processing, Yoram Bresler, Robert M. Gray, Stéphane Mallat, Rico Malvar, Robert D. Nowak, Antonio Ortega, and Gilbert Strang, and favorably reviewed in IEEE Signal Processing Magazine.

In 2013, Goyal's group invented first-photon imaging, a method to generate 3D depth and reflectivity images from exactly one detected photon per pixel, even when up to half of the detected photons are due to ambient light. Publication of an article introducing the method in Science resulted in widespread news coverage.

In an article published in Nature in 2019, Goyal's group introduced a method for non-line-of-sight imaging that uses only an ordinary digital camera. This contrasts with many earlier methods that use pulsed laser illumination and detectors sensitive to single photons.

U.S. patents have been issued for 19 of Goyal's inventions.

Awards and honors 

 1998 Eliahu I. Jury Award of the University of California, Berkeley for outstanding achievement in the area of systems, communications, control, or signal processing
 2002 IEEE Signal Processing Society Magazine Award for Multiple Description Coding: Compression Meets the Network
 2013 MIT $100K Entrepreneurship Competition Launch Contest Grand Prize for 3dim
 2014 IEEE International Conference on Image Processing Best Paper Award
 IEEE Signal Processing Society Distinguished Lecturer 2017-2018
 2017 IEEE Signal Processing Society Best Paper Award for Message-Passing De-Quantization with Applications to Compressed Sensing
 2018 IEEE International Conference on Computational Photography Best Poster Award
 2019 IEEE Signal Processing Society Best Paper Award for Photon-Efficient Computational 3D and Reflectivity Imaging with Single-Photon Detectors
2020 IEEE Signal Processing Society Young Author Best Paper Award for A Few Photons Among Many: Unmixing Signal and Noise for Photon-Efficient Active Imaging (co-author with Joshua Rapp)

References

External links

Foundations of Signal Processing
Vivek Goyal

20th-century births
Living people
American electrical engineers
American computer scientists
University of Iowa alumni
MIT School of Engineering faculty
Boston University faculty
Fellow Members of the IEEE
Year of birth missing (living people)
Place of birth missing (living people)
Fellows of Optica (society)
Electrical engineering academics